Ipan Priyanto (born January 19, 1990 in Semarang) is an Indonesian footballer who currently plays for Pelita Jaya FC in the Indonesia Super League.

Club statistics

Hounors

Clubs
Pelita Jaya U-21 :
Indonesia Super League U-21 runner-up : 1 (2009-10)

References

External links

1990 births
Association football defenders
Living people
Javanese people
Indonesian footballers
Liga 1 (Indonesia) players
Pelita Jaya FC players
PSIS Semarang players
Pesik Kuningan players
People from Semarang
Sportspeople from Central Java
21st-century Indonesian people